The Ba̠jju are an ethnic group found in the Middle Belt (Central) area of Nigeria. The word Ba̠jju is a short for "Ba̠nyet Jju" which simply means "Jju People" and is used to refer to the speakers of the Jju language found in the Ka̠jju, the homeland of the Jju people. They are found in the Southern part of Kaduna State, chiefly in Kachia, Zangon Kataf, Jama'a and in Kaduna South Local Government Areas. Ba̠jju people are also commonly known as "Kaje" which is a pejorative name used to refer to both the Jju people and Jju language by the larger Hausa people who could not pronounce the name Ka̠jju (meaning the land of the Ba̠jju people) well. The Ba̠jju people are predominantly farmers, hunters, blacksmiths and petty traders.

Origin and history

According to oral history, the origin of the Ba̠jju can be traced as far as Bauchi State where a group of people lived in hill caves and had watchers atop the hill to watch for enemies. These people were called 'mutanen duwatsu' (literal translation in English from Hausa is 'the mountain people' or 'ba̠nyet tsok in Jju). It was believed that their migration was for the search of better hunting grounds. They migrated from the Bauchi state part of the Jos-Bauchi high plateau and settled on a hill called 'Hurruang' in the Plateau state part of the area, in central Nigeria. The hill was already occupied by a tribe called the Afizere (also called 'Jarawa' by the Hausa), but the Afizere people left and lived on another hill called 'Tsok-kwon' (in Jju), probably same as Shere hills.

The Afizere also lay claims to migrating from the 'Miango' area, presently occupied by the Irigwe. The Ba̠jju, Irigwe, and Afizere tribes collectively called themselves 'Dangi' (meaning 'those of same stock', rendered in the Hausa language) because they share cultural and linguistic similarities.

Two brothers named Zampara and Wai were said to have left ‘Dangi’ settlement and migrated South of the Plateau.
The Atsam (also known as 'Chawai') people of today are the descendants Wai. Wai settled at a place and named it Chawai. Considering that the forefathers of both the Ba̠jju and Chawai (Atsam) people had family ties made both nations affiliated.

Zampara migrated further and settled at Hurbuang, which is now called Ungwan Tabo. Zampara had a wife named Adama (who was a Fulani woman) and gave birth to two sons, Ba̠ranzan and A̠kad. When Zampara, their father died A̠kad left his elder brother Ba̠ranzan and stayed near the hills. He did so and became the ancestor of the A̠takat people. That was how the A̠takat tribe got associated with the Ba̠jju. It was because of this close relationship that the Atakat and Ba̠jju people made it a tradition and a religious law never to intermarry.

Descendants of Ba̠ranzan

Ba̠ranzan had five sons namely:

A̠NKWAK was the eldest son of Ba̠ranzan. He had the following children: Ka̠murum, A̠kurdan, Kpunyai, A̠za̠wuru, Ka̠tsiik, Gatun, Byet, Duhuan, A̠tachab, Rika̠wa̠n, Chenchuuk, Rika̠yakwon, Zi̠bvong, Ka̠masa, A̠nkpang, and Byena.

TUAN the second son had the following children:
Zankirwa, A̠tutyen, Kukwan, Vongkpang,  Zat, Furgyam, Sansun, Ka̠mantsok, Dinyring, A̠mankwo, Kpong, Zantun, Dichu'a̠don.

A̠KA̠DON the third child had the following children:
Tsoriyang, Wadon, Rebvok, A̠bvong, Chiyua.

KANSHUWA the fourth child had the following children:
Jei, Dihwugwai, Zagwom, Ta̠bak, Baihom, Bairuap, Zambyin.

IDUANG the fifth and last born of Ba̠ranzan had the following children:
Zuturung, Zunkwa, Zansak, Dibyii, A̠bvo.
 
However, some stubborn Ba̠jju and A̠takat people intermarried, and this caused the widespread death of 1970, Gaiya (2013). The Gado of Ba̠jju, along with his people, met with the Gado of A̠takat, along with his people, to discuss the crisis of frequent deaths of people of both tribes as a result of the intermarriages.

They reached a decision to abolish the law religiously and traditionally so that there would not be any consequence for the intermarriage. That was how the A̠takat and Ba̠jju people began to intermarry freely.

The previously mentioned Ba̠ranzan (son of Zampara, and brother of A̠kad) left Hurbuang and cleared a place by a riverside called 'Duccuu Chen'. He settled the Ka̠jju there (Ka̠jju was the initial name of the Ba̠jju). The name 'Ka̠jju' was derived from the name which Ba̠ranzan gave the new settlement, which was 'Ka̠zzu'.

Although it is unclear from oral history when the migration occurred, but evidence suggests that the Ba̠jju were in their current location since the early 1800s, Gaiya (2013).

Culture

Bajju witchcraft and rites

There are many rites in Kajju land such as things like rain, farming, harvest, new house, pregnancy, and child-naming.
Tyyi Tson (Euthanasia): Tyyi Tson means 'to give hungry rice' (hungry rice was a type of rice which the Bajju thought of as the most sacred and perhaps elite). This practice involved offering an elderly woman poisoned hungry rice (called 'Kasap') to end her suffering of physical infirmity. It was usually done by one of her children or her sister.

Nkut: (witchcraft) This is the power to exert spiritual influence over another person. People who use Nkut are referred to as 'Akut', and are believed to have a second set of eyes. The first set allows one to see the physical, while the other is used to see into the spiritual realm.

Gajimale (water spirit): A gajimale comes out of rivers, or streams to seduce its victims by transforming into a good looking opposite sex of the victim. It was a belief that many rich people got their wealth from Gajimale, and in return, they gave children to it. Epilepsy (known as  meaning "fire of the river") was believed to be caused by the Gajimale.

A̠bvoi (or Abvwoi): The Bajju had a religious institution called the Abvoi. The leader of the Abvoi shrine was called the 'Gado Abvoi' or 'Dodo'. The 'Magajin Abvoi' is the one who translates the messages of Abvoi to the people. The celebrations involved masquerade dances.

Masquerades (Abusak): They represented the spirits in Abvoi celebrations. The Abusak danced with women and disciplines them by beating them.

Taboos and Superstitions

Children were not to eat eggs, and they were not to eat meat offered to them at other households, for it may be Nkut meat neither were they to go out in the heat of the midday sun, for they may accept food from Akut.

Women:
 Were not to eat eggs, for they would be 'eating' their own children;
 Were not allowed to eat chicken and birds in general;
 Were not to cook or carry out farm activities for 7 days following child birth;
 Were not allowed to hit the wall with their hands or feet, for they would be calling the Abvoi;
 Were not allowed to hit people with brooms, especially men, for they would be sweeping away all of his charms and power (including the power to impregnate a woman);
 Pregnant women were not to eat sugarcane; for their babies would grow too fat;
 Women were not to eat animal heads.

Men:
 Were not to allow their hair shaved halfway, for a spirit would come to finish the job, and cause the man to go mad;
 Were not to eat food prepared by menstruating women, for they would be exposed to blindness or bad luck in hunting;
 Were not to share secrets of the ancestor cult with women.

General taboos
 Spirit snakes should not be killed. It may be the spirit of a person sleeping or having a fever;
 Do not whistle at night; for it would call a spirit;
 Do not whistle in the house of a hunter; for his charms would stop working;
 Do not blow food to cool it;
 A visitor must not eat food alone. A person from the visited household must eat with the guest to prove the food is not poisoned;
 People were not to talk while eating. Even though a stranger came in, they should not greet until they finished eating;
 One should not answer a call at night; for the person might die;
 One should not step over arrows;
 A cock that crows between dusk and midnight must be killed; for it calls the spirits.

Rules
 Men are buried facing east (direction of Bajju origin) while women were buried facing west.
 Those who died as a result of falling off a tree, falling off the roof of a house, or shot during hunting, were buried where the incident took place, and do not receive a burial ceremony.
 Women who died during child birth were buried at the backyard of their home.
 Someone with small pox was isolated because they believed he was a wizard. They are not given a burial ceremony after dying.
 Before drinking, elders were to pour a few drops on the ground for the ancestors.
 The Bajju believed in reincarnation.
 The Bajju believed that when a shooting star passes across the sky, a great man has died somewhere and is going to land somewhere else for reincarnation.

Taking oaths
Men could swear the following oaths:

 : To swear on one's hoe. The oath was 'If I did this, may the hoe cut my leg'. 
 : To swear on one's bow.
 : To swear on a drum. A drum was kept with each village's gado (village head) and was used for matters affecting the entire village and used to settle local disputes.

Women could swear the following oaths:

 : To swear on one's headboard (the item used to rest loads atop women's heads). If her oath was false, her child birth would not be a safe delivery.
 : To swear on one's skin. The skin is the piece of clothing used to secure a child on her back. If the oath was false, the child in the skin would die.
 : To swear on one's axe. 'May her axe cut her if her oath is false'.

Life After Death 
Bājju People like any other tribe in African believe in life after death in the sense that they acknowledge that ancestors performs some function to enable human happiness and prosperity. Their will is sought for at any time and for every purpose in life. People seek to be in good terms with the ancestors, and they show them respect in their families. 
It is also believed that the elder must eat first before any other person and when taking drink, they have to pour some drops on the ground for the ancestors to take.

Language

The Bajju People, speak the Jju language, which is one of the Central Plateau languages, and seems to be a variant of Tyap, alongside Gworok, Fantswam, Takad, Tyuku, Tyap proper, Sholyio and Tyeca̠rak, whose speakers are ethnically distinct.

Politics 
The Ba̠jju people are governed by a traditional leader appointed by the Kaduna State government who governs the affairs of the people, whose headquarters is at Zonkwa (or A̠zunkwa).

The Ba̠jju paramount Leader is called A̠gwam Ba̠jju. The first monarch was late His Royal Highness, A̠gwam Ba̠jju I, and the current one is His Royal Highness Luka Kogi Yabuwat.

Notable people
Katung Aduwak: Winner of Big Brother Nigeria (Season 1, 2006).
Rachel Bakam: A Nigerian entertainer.
Maj. Gen. Ishaya Bakut: military governor Benue State (1986-1987); businessman who became vice-chairman of Anjeed Innova Group (2013-2015).
Barr. (Col.) Yohanna A. Madaki: Military governor of defunct Gongola State, Nigeria (1985-1986); military governor of Benue State (August 1986 –September 1986).
Engr. Stephen Rijo Shekari: deputy governor of Kaduna State (1999-2005).

References

Further reading
 Blench (2008) Prospecting proto-Plateau. Manuscript.
 Abel Gaiya (2013) http://diaryofanafrican.blogspot.com/2013/05/all-about-my-tribe-origin-superstition_12.html

Ethnic groups in Nigeria